Philip de László was an Anglo-Hungarian painter known particularly for his portraits of royal and aristocratic personages. He became a British subject in 1914.

Works

See also
Philip de László

References
Notes

Sources

External links
De László Catalogue Raisonne

László